Main Lakshmi Tere Aangan Ki is an Indian TV show which aired on Life OK from 19 December 2011 to 21 October 2012.

The show took a leap of eight years where Lakshmi dies giving birth to a baby girl, and the show takes a seven-year leap and focuses on the life of Kanchi, Lakshmi's lookalike.

A sequel titled Dream Girl started airing on 9 March 2015 on Life OK.

Synopsis

Lakshmi, a middle-class young girl aims at earning money as her mom died of pneumonia and they failed to afford her treatment. Aged 9, she has a crush on and wishes to marry Arjun Agnihotri but he moves to London for 10 years to complete his studies.

12 years later
Arjun returns to India, in disguise of Ajay Sharma. He meets and also falls in love with Lakshmi, knowing her crush of marrying him. As she learns Ajay is Arjun, Lakshmi proposes to him. Eventually he also confesses his feelings and they marry but Lakshmi feels neglected, misunderstanding that Arjun loves his former fiancée Saumya, so she leaves him.

3 months later

As Lakshmi uncovers the past truth, Arjun forgives her and helps family to get her back. Saumya is exposed to be only wanting Arjun's money and leaves. Arjun and Lakshmi get remarried.

1 year later

Arjun and Lakshmi have a daughter Jiyana, whom Lakshmi gave birth before dying. She knew about her pregnancy complications but never informed Arjun.

7 years later

Lakshmi's lookalike Kaanchi Kashyap is introduced. Jiyana is now 8, raised by Arjun. Astonished that Kaanchi looks like Lakshmi, she brings her to see Arjun under pretext of bringing a delivery. In time, Arjun and Kaanchi fall in love. They confess their love.

Cast

Main
 Shraddha Arya as Lakshmi Agnihotri/Kaanchi Kashyap- younger sister of Saraswati, wife of Arjun Agnihotri, mother of Jiyana
 Sudeep Sahir as Ajay Sharma/Arjun Agnihotri, husband of Lakshmi, father of Jiyana

Recurring
 Aadesh Chaudhary as Aditya
 Nisha Rawal as Soumya Diwan
 Abhishek Tiwari/Anuj Thakur as Ajay Agnihotri/Saravana
 Gurpreet Kaur as Swati
 Heena Parmar as Saraswati Vishal Chaturvedi-elder sister of Lakshmi.Wife of Vishal Chaturvedi.Massi of Jiyana.
 Anshul Trivedi as Vishal Chaturvedi
 Ajay Arya/Dishank Arora as Akaash Agnihotri
 Aruna Irani as Dadiji
 Anil Dhawan as Lakshmi's father
 Vinny Arora as Ginnu
 Pallavi Rao as Kishori
 Aarya Rawal as Renuka Agnihotri
 Arbaaz Ali Khan as Rajvardhan Agnihotri
 Simran Khanna as Purva
 Roshni Walia as Jiyana Agnihotri-Lakshmi and Arjun's daughter
 Dinesh Kaushik
 Ali Zafar as Nikhil (cameo)
 Madhuri Dixit (special appearance for Lakshmi's marriage)
 Malaika Arora (special appearance for Lakshmi's marriage)

References

Indian drama television series
Indian television soap operas
2011 Indian television series debuts
2012 Indian television series endings
Life OK original programming
Shashi Sumeet Productions series